Hymn to Freedom may refer to:

 "Hymn to Liberty", the national anthem of Greece and Cyprus
 "Hymn to Freedom" (Oscar Peterson song), a song by Oscar Peterson from the 1962 album Night Train

See also
 Ode to Freedom (disambiguation)